Gomphocerini is a tribe of grasshoppers of the family Acrididae.

Genera
The Orthoptera Species File lists the following:
 Aeropedellus Hebard, 1935
 Bruneria McNeill, 1897
 Chorthippus Fieber, 1852
 Dasyhippus Uvarov, 1930
 Gomphoceridius Bolívar, 1914 - monotypic G.  brevipennis (Brisout de Barneville, 1848)
 Gomphocerippus Roberts, 1941
 Gomphoceroides Zheng, Xi & Lian, 1992
 Gomphocerus Thunberg, 1815 including Gomphocerus sibiricus
 Mesasippus Tarbinsky, 1931
 Myrmeleotettix Bolívar, 1914
 Pezohippus Bei-Bienko, 1948
 Phlibostroma Scudder, 1875 - monotypic P. quadrimaculatum (Thomas, 1871)
 Pseudochorthippus Defaut, 2012
 Schmidtiacris Storozhenko, 2002
 Stauroderus Bolívar, 1897
 Stenobothroides Xu & Zheng, 1996 - monotypic S. xinjiangensis Xu & Zheng, 1996

References 

Gomphocerinae
Orthoptera tribes
Taxa named by Franz Xaver Fieber